Iskra Mihaylova (born 7 September 1957 in Sofia) is a Bulgarian politician and Member of the European Parliament (MEP) from Bulgaria who has been a Member of the European Parliament since July 2014. She is a member of the Movement for Rights and Freedoms, part of the Alliance of Liberals and Democrats for Europe Party.

Early life and education
Mihaylova earned a master's degree in Library Studies and Information Technologies from the Saint-Petersburg State University of Culture and Arts in 1980. She trained as a librarian and bibliographer at the State Library Institute of Bulgaria and then at the Leningrad Institute of Culture.

Career
Mihaylova worked for the SS. Cyril and Methodius National Library from 1980 to 1996.  In 1996, Mihaylova was an American Library Association Fellow working at the Colorado State Library.

Political career
In parliament, Mihaylova has been serving as chair of the Committee on Regional Development. 

In addition to her committtee assignments, Mihaylova is part of the parliament's delegations to the EU-Armenia and EU-Azerbaijan Parliamentary Cooperation Committees and the EU-Georgia Parliamentary Association Committee, to the EU-Former Yugoslav Republic of Macedonia Joint Parliamentary Committee and to the Euronest Parliamentary Assembly. She is also a member of the European Parliament Intergroup on Small and Medium-Sized Enterprises (SMEs). 

In June 2019, Mihaylova was elected vice-president of the political group Renew Europe.

Recognition
Mihaylova was the winner of the Regional Development Award at the 2017 MEP Awards.

References

Living people
1957 births
Women MEPs for Bulgaria
Movement for Rights and Freedoms MEPs
MEPs for Bulgaria 2014–2019
Politicians from Sofia
Bulgarian librarians
Women librarians
Saint-Petersburg State University of Culture and Arts alumni
MEPs for Bulgaria 2019–2024